Lake Maardu (also known earlier as Lake Liivakandi) is a lake on the southern side of the town of Maardu, in northern Estonia.

Lake Maardu was a natural waterbody before 1894 when the landowner of Maardu Manor Otto von Brevern dug a ditch to the sea and the lake run empty. It was restored in 1939.

Maardu village with Maardu Manor is located on the southeastern side of the lake.

References

Lakes of Estonia
Jõelähtme Parish
Lakes of Harju County